Chigozie Ogbu is a Nigerian academician and the current substantive Vice chancellor of Ebonyi State University. He was appointed by the Governor of Ebonyi State David Umahi to replace Prof. Francis Idike.

References

Nigerian politicians
Academic staff of Ebonyi State University
Living people
Year of birth missing (living people)